William John Brown (August 15, 1805 – March 18, 1857) was a U.S. Representative from Indiana.

Early life
Born August 15, 1805 near Washington, Kentucky, Brown moved to Clermont County, Ohio, in 1808 with his parents, who settled near New Richmond. He attended the common schools and Franklin Academy in Clermont County. He moved to Rushville, Indiana in 1821, studied law and was admitted to the bar in 1826, commencing practice in Rushville.

Political career
Brown served as a member of the Indiana House of Representatives from 1829-1832. He worked as a prosecutor from 1831 to 1835, and then served as Secretary of State of Indiana from 1836-1840. He moved to Indianapolis, Indiana in 1837 and was again a member of the Indiana House of Representatives from 1841-1843.

He was elected as a Democrat to the Twenty-eighth Congress (March 4, 1843 – March 3, 1845). He was appointed Second Assistant Postmaster General by President Polk and served in that capacity from 1845 until 1849.

Brown was elected to the Thirty-first Congress (March 4, 1849 – March 3, 1851). He was an unsuccessful candidate for renomination in 1850.

Life after politics
Brown became chief editor of the Indianapolis Sentinel in 1850, working there until 1855. He served many times as chairman of the Democratic State central committee of Indiana. He was appointed by President Pierce as special agent of the Post Office Department for Indiana and Illinois, a position he held from 1853 until his death near Indianapolis, Indiana on March 18, 1857. He was interred in Crown Hill Cemetery.

References

1805 births
1857 deaths
Burials at Crown Hill Cemetery
Secretaries of State of Indiana
Democratic Party members of the Indiana House of Representatives
Democratic Party members of the United States House of Representatives from Indiana
People from Mason County, Kentucky
People from New Richmond, Ohio
People from Rushville, Indiana
19th-century American politicians